The 2019–20 season was PEC Zwolle's 109th season of play, it marked its 18th season in the Eredivisie and its 8th consecutive season in the top flight of Dutch football. They ended the season fifteenth in the league. PEC Zwolle entered the KNVB Cup in the second round. The lost in the second round against Fortuna Sittard (0–2).

Due to the COVID-19 pandemic, on 21 April, Dutch Prime Minister Mark Rutte announced that events that require a permit are forbidden until 1 September. This meant that football matches were also not allowed, resulting in the end of the 2019–20 Eredivisie season. As a result, the KNVB decided on 24 April to maintain the current league positions, but not to appoint a champion. Since PEC Zwolle was in fifteenth place on 8 March (after the last completed round). It was awarded that place.

Competitions

Friendlies

Eredivisie

League table

Results summary

Results by round

Matches

KNVB Cup

Statistics

Appearances and goals

|-
|colspan="14"|Players sold or loaned out after the start of the season:

|-

Goalscorers

Last updated: 1 March 2020

Disciplinary record

Last updated: 1 March 2020

References

PEC Zwolle seasons
PEC Zwolle